The Manchester Moss Side by-election of 13 July 1978 was held after the death of Labour Member of Parliament (MP) Frank Hatton. Labour held on to the seat in the by-election.

Results

References

Manchester Moss Side by-election
Moss Side
Manchester Moss Side by-election
Moss Side by-election, 1978
Manchester Moss Side by-election